The Catalan Mediterranean System, also known as Mediterranean System, Transversal Ibero-Pyrenaean System, and Catalanid System, is a wide coastal geographical region in Catalonia. It is made up of a double system of coastal mountain chains: The Catalan Coastal Range and the Catalan Pre-Coastal Range, as well as the Catalan Coastal Depression and other coastal and pre-coastal plains located among those mountain ranges.

Geology
Geologically the Catalan Mediterranean System is the result of a tectonic uplift, about 300 km long and roughly 50 km wide.

Transversally the system can be divided in three zones:
Northern Zone, between the Empordà comarca and the Llobregat. This zone is of paleozoic and crystalline composition
Central Zone, between rivers Llobregat and Ebre
Southern Zone, between the Baix Ebre comarca and the Millars River in the Valencian Community. Both the central and the southern zone are of mesozoic and tertiary composition.

See also
Catalan Coastal Range
Catalan Pre-Coastal Range
Catalan Coastal Depression

References

External links
 El Relleu - Grup Enciclopèdia Catalana
 Sistema Mediterrani Català - Fundació Torre del Palau
 El Sistema Mediterrani - Regions Naturals de Catalunya

Geography of Catalonia